Cork Golf Club is a golf club located in Little Island, Cork, Republic of Ireland.

History
The club, founded in 1888, hosted the 1932 Irish Open, won by Alf Padgham and the 1932 England–Ireland Professional Match.

It held the 1964 Jeyes Tournament, the 1965 Carroll's International and the R.T.V. International Trophy in 1968 and 1969.

References

External links

Facebook page

Golf in Munster
Golf clubs and courses in the Republic of Ireland
Sports venues in County Cork
Tourist attractions in County Cork
Irish Open (golf) venues
1888 establishments in Ireland
Sports clubs in County Cork